Julius Dessauer (1832–1883) was a Hungarian rabbi and writer.

Dessauer was born in Neutra to Gabriel L. Dessauer. He was for some years rabbi at Újpest.

Bibliography
Die Fünf Bücher Moses. Nebst dem Raschi-Commentar, Punktirt, Leichtfasslich Uebersetzt und mit AnmerkungenVersehen, Budapest, 1863 archive.org 
Schulchan Aruch, Orach Hayyim, Deutsch Bearbeitet, 1868
Spruch-Lexikon des Talmud und Midrash, 1876
Schlüssel zum Gebetbuche, 1878 
Perlenschatz: Philosophische Sentenzen in Alphabetischer Reihenfolge, 1880 
Der Jüdische Humorist, 1899

References

1832 births
1883 deaths
Rabbis from Budapest
Hungarian writers
People from Újpest